North Hamilton Elementary School, formerly the Jennings High School, is a historic school in Jennings, Florida. The high school was built in 1927 and converted to an elementary school in 1965. On January 10, 2008, it was added to the U.S. National Register of Historic Places. It is a part of the Hamilton County School District.

North Hamilton Elementary was be consolidated into a new elementary school, Hamilton County Elementary School, located in an unincorporated area south of Jasper. Its opening was scheduled for August 2017.

References

External links

 

Buildings and structures in Hamilton County, Florida
Schools in Hamilton County, Florida
Public elementary schools in Florida
Public high schools in Florida
School buildings on the National Register of Historic Places in Florida
National Register of Historic Places in Hamilton County, Florida